A trifecta is a type of horse racing bet.

Trifecta may also refer to:

Trifecta (album), a 2009 album by Pavlo, Rik Emmett, and Oscar Lopez
"Trifecta" (Judge Dredd story), published in the comic 2000 AD in 2012
Government trifecta, in which the same political party controls the executive branch and both chambers of the legislative branch

See also
The Trifecta, television sports show broadcast by ESPN
Trifecta Entertainment & Media, a production company established by former Metro-Goldwyn-Mayer Television executives
Trifekta, a defunct Australia based record label